German Township is a township in Grundy County, Iowa, USA.

References

Populated places in Grundy County, Iowa
Townships in Iowa